Giuseppe Antonio Berardinelli (March 28, 1922 – June 2, 2001) was an American professional boxer. He was a World Light Heavyweight Champion. He took the ring-name Joey Maxim from the Maxim gun, the world's first self-acting machine gun, based on his ability to rapidly throw a large number of left jabs.

Early life 
Maxim was born and raised in Collinwood, a neighborhood of Cleveland, Ohio.

Career

Early career
Maxim learned to box at a very young age. Following a successful amateur career, during which he won the Golden Gloves, he turned professional in 1940. Maxim boxed fairly regularly at exhibitions during the war years while serving as a military police officer at Miami Beach, Florida.

Maxim becomes world champion
It is somewhat surprising that Maxim had to wait so long for a world title shot, he was 28 and had already fought 87 times as a professional, considering his undoubted ability.  His chance came on January 24, 1950, against British boxer Freddie Mills, who was making his first defense, at London's Earl's Court Exhibition Centre.  Maxim, very much the underdog against the popular Englishman, won the fight by knockout in the 10th round.  After the fight three of Mills's teeth were found embedded in Maxim's left glove, Mills never fought again.

Maxim's next major fight was on May 30, 1951, when he made a bid for Ezzard Charles's world heavyweight title. Maxim was unsuccessful, losing on points.

June 25, 1952: Joey Maxim vs. Sugar Ray Robinson
The most famous fight of Maxim's career was on June 25, 1952, when he made his second defense of his world light heavyweight crown, against Sugar Ray Robinson at Yankee Stadium.  The fight had originally been scheduled for June 23, but was postponed due to torrential rain.  By the time the fight took place New York City was in the midst of a record heat wave.

During the fight Robinson built up a large points lead over the champion, although Maxim began to come on later in the fight. Robinson gradually succumbed to hyperthermia and Maxim's harder punches.  He collapsed to the canvas at the end of the 13th round, but managed to stagger back to his corner.  However, Robinson failed to answer the bell at the start of the 14th, even though he only had to remain on his feet to win the fight and Maxim won by a technical knockout.  This was the only time that Robinson was stopped in his 200 fight career.

By this time the original referee, Ruby Goldstein, had himself been forced to retire from the fight after collapsing into the ropes complaining that he could no longer continue.  This meant that a substitute referee, Ray Miller, had to be called out to finish the fight.  Goldstein and Robinson were not the only people who had to be stretchered from the stadium: several dozen spectators also collapsed during the fight.  Between them, the two fighters lost over 20 pounds in weight during the fight.

Late career
Despite winning, the Robinson fight took a heavy toll on Maxim.  He lost his world title six months later to the veteran Archie Moore.  Following this loss Maxim, formerly one of the division's most active fighters, fought only 14 fights in the remaining 6 years of his career.  These fights included two rematches with "The Old Mongoose" Archie Moore, both of which Maxim lost.  Maxim retired in 1958 after losing six consecutive fights.

Maxim retired with a record of 82 wins (21 by KO), 29 losses, and 4 draws; in his 115 fight career, he was knocked out only once.  During his career he defeated such legendary figures as Jersey Joe Walcott, Jimmy Bivins, Sugar Ray Robinson, and Floyd Patterson.

Life after boxing
After his retirement Maxim spent time as a stand-up comic, restaurateur, and taxi driver. He also served as a greeter at hotels and casinos located in Las Vegas.

He appeared in Herschell Gordon Lewis's 1963 nudie-cutie Goldilocks and the Three Bares as himself, playing a nightclub owner.  The movie was billed as the "first nudist musical." He was prominently featured on the movie poster, with the blurb:

"It's me...Joey Maxim, the former world's light heavyweight champion! I'm one of the stars! My first screen appearance."

The role did not lead to any more motion picture work, though he did appear as an extra in the 1999 film Play It to the Bone.

He was inducted into the International Boxing Hall of Fame in 1994.

Maxim's wife Michelina, with whom he had two daughters, died in 1977.

In February 2001, Maxim  suffered a stroke. He died in West Palm Beach, Florida on June 2, 2001. In addition to his daughters, he was survived by his mother, Henrietta Berardinelli, who was 97 years old (died at 101 in 2006), and six great-grandchildren.

Professional boxing record

See also
List of light heavyweight boxing champions

References

External links 

Joey Maxim – CBZ Profile

1922 births
2001 deaths
American people of Italian descent
American male boxers
International Boxing Hall of Fame inductees
Light-heavyweight boxers
Boxers from Cleveland
Winners of the United States Championship for amateur boxers